The Giurgeni–Vadu Oii Bridge is a bridge in Romania, over the Danube river, between Giurgeni commune and Vadu Oii village on the DN2A (E60) national road. Situated on River - Km 237,8, it connects the regions of Muntenia and Dobruja.

See also
European route E60
Roads in Romania
List of bridges in Romania

References

External links

Bridges at the Danube at danubecommission.org

Bridges in Romania
Bridges over the Danube
Buildings and structures in Constanța County
Buildings and structures in Ialomița County
Bridges completed in 1970